Black Pistol Fire is a Canadian-born, Austin-based rock duo. The group consists of Kevin McKeown (guitar/lead vocals) and Eric Owen (drums). Their sound is a mix of classic southern rock and garage punk.

History

Early Years
Kevin McKeown and Eric Owen met in kindergarten at a North Toronto elementary school. They started playing Rock and Roll together in high school.

Deadbeat Graffiti
In 2017, Consequence of Sound named them best early-day wake up call at Riot Fest 2017 and selected them as the best performance at Voodoo Fest 2017.

They achieved breakout success in 2018 with "Lost Cause" reaching number one and "Bully" reaching number five in Canada rock airplay.

Discography

Studio albums
 2011 - Black Pistol Fire - self-released
 2012 - Big Beat '59 - Rifle Bird Records
 2014 - Hush Or Howl - Modern Outsider
 2016 - Don't Wake the Riot - Modern Outsider 
 2017 - Deadbeat Graffiti - Rifle Bird Records 
 2021 - Look Alive - Black Hill Records

EPs
 2012 - Shut-Up!

Singles
 2015 - Damaged Goods/Mama’s Gun
 2019 - Level
 2019 - Black Halo
 2019 - Temper Temper/So Real
 2019 - Pick Your Poison
 2019 - Well Wasted
 2020 - Hope in Hell
 2021 - Look Alive No. 32 Billboard Alternative Airplay

References

Canadian blues rock musical groups
Punk blues musical groups
Musical groups from Toronto
Canadian musical duos
Rock music duos
Musical groups established in 2011
2011 establishments in Texas